Hussainabad (also called Nalka Adda) is a town of Bhawana City 10 km away from it. It is the big town of Bhawana, Punjab, Pakistan, and mostly residents are farmers.

Location 
It is located on Jhang, Chiniot road. It is 10 km away from Bhawana towards Jhang. It is located on the bank of Chenab River.

References

Chiniot District
Populated places in Chiniot District